Kazuyuki Hyodo (born: 14 July 1964) is a sailor from Shiga, Japan. who represented his country at the 1996 Summer Olympics in Savannah, United States as crew member in the Soling. With helmsman Kazunori Komatsu and fellow crew member Masatoshi Hazama they took the 19th place.

References

Living people
1964 births
Sailors at the 1996 Summer Olympics – Soling
Olympic sailors of Japan
Japanese male sailors (sport)